Mitja Kunc (born 12 November 1971 in Črna na Koroškem, SFR Yugoslavia), is a former Slovenian alpine skier.

He has one victory in Alpine Skiing World Cup. The first peak of his career was in 1994 Winter Olympics, where he finished 4th in slalom. In the following years he was treated for injuries until the second peak of his career in years 2000–2002, when he won a race in Yongpyong and a bronze medal in Alpine World Ski Championships 2001, both of them in slalom. He retired in 2005 after the race in Kranjska Gora.

World Cup results

Season standings

Race podiums
 1 win (1 SL)
 6 podiums (4 SL, 2 GS)

Olympic Games results

World Championships results

References

1971 births
Slovenian male alpine skiers
Olympic alpine skiers of Slovenia
Living people
Alpine skiers at the 1992 Winter Olympics
Alpine skiers at the 1994 Winter Olympics
Alpine skiers at the 1998 Winter Olympics
Alpine skiers at the 2002 Winter Olympics
People from the Municipality of Črna na Koroškem